Silvester Šereš (7 March 1918 – 20 January 2000) was a Yugoslav footballer of Hungarian ethnicity.

Career
Born in Temerin, he played with Temerin TC, Újvidéki AC, MTK Budapest, Partizan, Spartak Subotica, Vojvodina and Sloga Temerin.

References

1918 births
2000 deaths
People from Temerin
Hungarians in Vojvodina
Serbian footballers
Yugoslav footballers
Association football forwards
NAK Novi Sad players
Yugoslav First League players
MTK Budapest FC players
FK Partizan players
FK Spartak Subotica players
FK Vojvodina players
FK Sloga Temerin players